Laura is an unincorporated community in Lewis County, in the U.S. state of Missouri.

History
Laura was laid out in 1893. A post office called Laura was established in 1892, and remained in operation until 1902. The identity of Laura's namesake has been lost to history.

References

Unincorporated communities in Lewis County, Missouri
Unincorporated communities in Missouri